is a 2003 Japanese anime television series based on Yoshiaki Kawajiri's Ninja Scroll. The series is directed by Tatsuo Sato and animated by Madhouse.

Plot 
The story takes place in feudal Japan and follows the adventures of Jubei Kibagami, a mercenary ninja tasked with guarding the fabled relic known as the "Dragon Stone" and protecting its bearer, Shigure the "Light Maiden", from both the Hiruko and Kimon Clans' forces; alongside him on this quest are the government spy, Dakuan, and the mountain thief, Tsubute.

Characters

Main characters
Jubei Kibagami

 is the protagonist of the show. He is a wandering vagabond ninja who wants nothing but to find a place to rest until one day he finds himself involved in a conflict between the Hiruko and Kimon ninja clans. Later, one of the Hiruko Clan members asks him guard the Dragon Stone and Shigure, now he's on an adventure to protect her from both the Hiruko and the Kimon. A master swordsmen, Jubei can swings his blade so quickly he can launch a vacuum blade; allowing him to cut down foes at a distance. He also carriers a hidden throwing dagger and a length of wire connected to his sword for emergencies.
Shigure

All her life,  has lived in the mountains until her village was burnt to the ground by the Kimon Clan. Lost and confused, she doesn't know what to do until she meets Dakuan and Tsubute and realizes that she must go to the village of Yagyu. Shigure is known as the Light Maiden and is highly treasured by her people as well as the ninja chasing her. She is later revealed to actually be the lost treasure of an Ancient Kingdom itself possessing supernatural powers, but when given the chance, she chooses to reject them so as to lead a normal life.
Tsubute

 is a very sneaky mountain thief who ends up tagging along with Dakuan and Shigure and is always trying to steal the Dragon Stone whenever he can. However, despite his greedy and cowardly nature, Tsubute is ultimately a good person at heart. At the end of the series, he's living in Shigure's old valley alongside her and the surviving Hiruko Clan.
Dakuan

An elderly ninja working for the government,  appears to help Shigure and Tsubute when they are being pursued by a gang of thugs in the woods and later on decides to help them by enlisting the help of Jubei. Although stronger and smarter than Tsubute, Dakuan is equally squirrelly and is revealed to be after the treasure of the Ancient Kingdom himself. While old and not very physically imposing, he makes use of clever (if not frustrating) tactics as well as his extendable staff and various explosive to win fights.

The Hiruko Clan
Mufu

Mufu is the leader of the Hiruko Clan fighting against the Kimon Clan. When the Dragon Stone was stolen, he sends his fellow clansmen to find and take it back from Jubei. He perishes alongside his twin brother, Yamidoro, after Shigure renounces her power as the Light Maiden. His powers are mysterious, but he's been shown using abilities such as necromancy, aerokinesis, and flight as well as being shown to be proficient in the use a seven-branch sword.
Rouga

Rouga is a stern shinobi that wears an iron mask. He is the one responsible for stealing the Dragon Stone from the Hiruko to give to the light maiden. He fails in his quest, but is able to give the stone to Jubei for safekeeping. He has werewolf-like abilities, his full transformation occurring when he removes his mask. He is killed during the Kimon clan's assault on Shigure's village by Ubume's rodents.
Mozuku

Mozuku is a goblin-like shinobi with green skin and a specialized gland on his forehead that spews a thick, web-like substance. He was sent after Roga to retrieve the Dragon Stone, but is attacked by the Kimon ninja in the process and eventually killed by Ubume's rodents.
Nekome

Nekome is a maliciously playful yet reasonable kunoichi with feline-like feet and claws. She attacks Jubei in an attempt to recapture the Dragon Stone, unaware that Roga entrusted it to him. She is killed in battle by Jubei in which he slices her in two.
Nubatama

Nubatama is a coquettish kunoichi with long, dark hair she can manipulate freely to attack her enemies. She tries to seduce Jyashi, who spurns her advances, before attacking him and being run through from behind by Rengoku. Somehow though, despite being stabbed through the heart, she manages to survive and returns to get revenge on Rengoku but is defeated by the other kunoichi and slain, turning into a mummified corpse.

Azami is a surreptitious kunoichi who can extend her limbs into root-like appendages which she can use as weapons or merge with the surrounding flora to manipulate their root systems. She works covertly from a safe distance, using the roots to attack her opponents. She manages to steal the Dragon Stone from Jubei but ends up splitting it in two in the process. She retains one half but loses it later to Kitsunebi. She is eventually attacked and mortally wounded by Kawahori and dies, but not before giving Jubei half of the Dragon Stone, her body then fuses with a tree that serves as her tomb. 
Dakatsu

Dakatsu is a grotesque shinobi with an oddly-shaped body and a tail with a poisonous stinger capable of killing a bear within seconds. He tries to manipulate Rengoku by assisting her in killing Jubei in exchange for the stone and her own limbs, which he believes will make him less ugly, but he is tricked and murdered in the end by Rengoku when she controls her body parts on him and forces him to drown himself in the river.
Hakurou

Hakurou is a venomous shinobi with a body covered in reptile scales and has a lizard-like face. His skin is thick enough to withstand a direct attack from Jubei's air blade. He carries a pair of swords on his back, but primarily fights by firing the scales from his back to shred his opponents from a distance. Jubei eventually kills him by ramming his sword down his throat.
Nenmu

Nenmu is a bodiless shinobi that exists as only a single eye and a purple, ooze-like substance. He gains possession of a host by forcefully invading his victim's body and taking control, living on even after they die. He takes possession of a number of travelers taking refuge from the rain along with Jubei. One of the travelers (a mother traveling with her son) is possessed but manages to gain some control over herself and walks into a nearby fire, causing Nenmu to exit her body in a panic and leaving himself vulnerable to being cut down by Jubei. 
Zoufu

Zoufu is a self-possessed man with a Western styled broadsword and enough skill with it to use the same vacuum blade attack as Jubei. He has a monstrous parasite that has lived in his abdomen most, if not all, of his life. He has tried numerous times to kill the beast by coaxing it out, often by putting his life in danger, as the creature always comes to his aid during battle in order to preserve itself. His duel with Jubei leads to him finally killing the beast only to realize that its death meant his own as well and that, ironically, he was a far bigger parasite then that of the creature. 
Rokai

Rokai is an exuberant shinobi with a voracious appetite and an effeminate disposition. He was imprisoned by his own clan, perhaps for being so annoying, but escaped to find Shigure, the light maiden. He possesses the ability to expand his squat frame into a massively obese, grub-like form. He is killed by Yamidoro while trying to protect Jubei.
The Child

An unnamed little girl with the ability to turn into an monstrous-looking hag by growing a second face on the back of her head. She is very agile and fights with a long cloth with sharp edges. After trying to steal the stone in a ship, she is defeated and befriended by Jubei, but is accidentally killed by Renya after she tries to stop him from fighting Kibagami.
Mokuji & Ashizo
Voiced by: Andy Philpot (Mokiju), Jack Fletcher (Ashizo) (English)
Mokuji is an infant-sized shinobi that lives stuffed in the mouth of a big, green, dumb shinobi named, Ashizo. Mokuji seems to be the brains whereas Ashizo is the brawn. Ashizo is run through by ninja under the spell of Utsushiei, then decapitated. Mokuji is left defenseless and is stabbed by Utsushiei disguised as Shigure.

The Kimon Clan
Anden Yamidoro

Anden Yamidoro is the leader of the Kimon Clan who wants to overthrow the Hiruko Clan and use the Light Maiden's power to overtake the shogun. He is later revealed to be the brother of Mufu, leader of the Hiruko clan. Yamidoro and Mufu are small, identical twins who reside in what appear to be robotic bodies. He has the ability to generate deadly bolts of electricity and energy waves capable of disintegrating everything. 
Yamikubo

Yamikubo, or the "Shogun of Darkness", is Yamidoro's master who wishes to overthrow the Tokugawa Shogunate by using the fortune of the Dragon Stone. He is killed by a Yagyu samurai with a stab to the back while trying to reach the treasure but is revealed to be actually be a body double.
Magai

Magai is a diminutive, makeup-wearing shinobi that wields a giant spear; attached is a peddle-powered umbrella that spins and flies like a helicopter. While trying to steal the Dragon Stone from Rouga, he is cut down by Jubei.
Ubume

Ubume is a malevolent kunoichi with a body of semi-metamorphosing flesh. Her son, Yadorigi (voiced by Akio Suyama) is melded with her body and can come to the surface to form his own tiny body. Also melded with her body is a small army of sharp-toothed "rodents" that can freely attack her opponent as well as merge into one giant rodent. Her primary weapon is a flaming thorn whip. She attempts to steal the Dragon Stone from Roga, but is scared off by Jubei's intervention. She later returns to attack Shigure's village, only to be slain by Jubei, which also causes the deaths of Yadorigi and her rodents.
Jyashi

Jyashi is a stolid shinobi with a specialized eye socket that houses a device capable of hypnosis, transporting his opponents into an illusory world, as well as enabling to take an eye from a corpse and place it within the empty socket to see what it saw in its final moments. His left arm is mechanical, containing both his sword and a built-in automatic crossbow launcher with a tremendous firing rate. He is the brother of Rengoku. Jubei defeats him by throwing a dart into his artificial eye, disabling his illusions, before cutting him down.
Rengoku

Rengoku is a mysterious kunoichi with a unique body and talent for self-surgery. Rengoku can sew replacement or extra body parts onto herself. She has four arms and a variety of stitch patterns across her body. Her arms stretch out to resemble spindly spider legs and she is viewed as a monster by local villagers. She is obsessed with her brother to the point of incest. His death sent her on a path of vengeance against Jubei, instead of focusing on collecting the Dragon Stone. She is killed by Yamidoro as he petrifies her, causing her body to crumble like crushing rocks, while in her madness mistaking him for Jyashi.
Kitsunebi

Kitsunebi is a bloodthirsty shinobi that possesses a semi-transparent, glass-like body, through which a blue flame can be seen in his chest. He's able to control a swarm of moths that can block attacks and sprinkle a sleeping powder on his enemies. With concentration and mysticism he calls forth a giant moth composed of red energy. Like many of the ninja, he has a wicked personality, exhibited in his attempted rape of Azami. He is killed when his body was shattered by Jubei's sword in a sulfur pit that repelled Kitsunebi's moths.
Tobizaru

Tobizaru is a shinobi with a baboon-like appearance. He commands a horde of lesser monkey ninja. He uses strange angled swords as well as retractable, wrist-mounted, straight swords. He is actually much smaller than he first appears, as he wears an anthropomorphic, mechanical suit which just shows his head. He is killed by an explosion caused by Yamidoro in an attempt to kill Jubei.
Gouten

Gouten appears to be an inhumanly large shinobi with tank-like armor who carries two giant clubs that act as wheels on which he rolls like a car; on his back are four mounted flamethrowers. However, this is all a façade, as Gouten is actually a human-sized ninja that drives the enormous body like a mecha. He also controls a little mechanical girl that acts as a spy, and a mechanical bird that acts as a messenger. He is killed by a trick of Dakuan's that resulted in him falling down a cliff to the bottom of a lake where he drowned, unable to escape in time.
Aizen

Aizen is a manipulative shinobi who has a golden rifle in place of his right arm. He tries to convince Tatsunosuke into joining the Kimon clan. He is killed when Jubei flings his sword into Aizen's forehead.
Kawahori

Kawahori is a snide shinobi that has gray skin and white hair, complete with pointed ears and fangs. He has a pair of mechanical bat wings, granting him flight, and he controls a colony of bats that he uses to enshroud his opponent. He can also extend his tongue as a proboscis. He is killed by Jubei while attempting to steal the second half of the Dragon Stone from Azami. His name means bat.
Utsushiei

Utsushiei is a conniving kunoichi who uses special acupuncture pins she places into the necks of others that allows her to control their minds as well as the ability to take the form of others by manipulating her own flesh, such as when she manifested as Shigure (after controlling/seducing the Light Maiden) and managed to fool her companions flawlessly. She is killed by Yamidoro in his attempt to send Jubei into a volcano.

Other characters 
Tatsunosuke

Tatsunosuke, calling himself "Mr. Diamond", is a thief with the ability to change his body into diamonds. He later meets up with Tsubute and they become friends. He is totally useless when he is hungry.
Yayoi

Yayoi is Tatsunosuke's sister. While her brother is out, she grows vegetables so that they will not go hungry. She considers her brother useless since he cannot do anything right.
Renya Yagyu

A government ninja from the Yagyu clan who was sent to find Shigure and collect the Dragon Stone. He is cold-blooded and doesn't care if his men die before him. He seeks to kill Shigure due to her possessing the dangerous powers of the Ancients, leading to him and Jubei clashing in an epic battle within the heart of the volcano; it's left unknown whether or not he survived in the end.
Yasubei Yagyu

An elder of the Yagyu clan, sent before Renya to find Shigure. He decides to kill her in order to stop the Kimon and Hiruko clans, but is stopped and killed by Zoufu and his parasite respectively.
Genza

Genza was an old man who looked after Shigure while she lives in the hidden village. Despite Shigure trying to prove she isn't a child anymore, he still treats her like one. He and his fellow villagers are killed by the Kimon Clan when they attack.

Episodes

Soundtrack 

Ninja Scroll is an original soundtrack to Japanese TV series of the same name, written and directed by Yoshiaki Kawajiri. Taking place in ancient Japan, Ninja Scroll is the story of a wandering Ninja warrior named Jubei. The music for the soundtrack is co-scored by Kitaro and Peter (Peas) McEvilley.

Track listing

Personnel
Kitaro - Keyboards, Producer, Engineer, Mixing
Gary Barlough - Engineer
Peas - Composer
Rachel Leslie - Vocals
Gavin Lurssen - Mastering
Additional Personnel
Eiichi Naito - Album Producer
Dino Malito - A&R
Tatsuya Hayashi - A&R
Howard Sapper - Business & Legal Affairs
Kio Griffith - Art Direction, Design

References

External links 
Ninja Scroll: Urban Vision Series Official Website (Archived from the original on 2008-06-02)
 
 
 Animerica review

2003 anime television series debuts
Discotek Media
Madhouse (company)
Ninja in anime and manga
Samurai in anime and manga

ja:獣兵衛忍風帖